Harry Lake Aspen Provincial Park is a provincial park in British Columbia, Canada, located northwest of Ashcroft near the upper basin of Hat Creek.

See also
Bedard Aspen Provincial Park
Blue Earth Lake Provincial Park
Cornwall Hills Provincial Park

References

Provincial parks of British Columbia
Thompson Country
1996 establishments in British Columbia
Protected areas established in 1996